The Karpinsky Group is a volcanic group located at the southern end of Paramushir Island, Kuril Islands, Russia. The group is capped by two gently sloping cones rising to a height of 1,326 m. They are composed of andesites and andesite-basalts. In the two craters there are fumaroles and fountains of liquid sulfur. The last major, and only historic, eruption was in 1952. The sides of the volcanoes have been heavily glaciated leaving a number of cirques which were initially thought to be eroded craters.  The volcanoes were named after the geologist Aleksandr Petrovich Karpinsky.

See also
 List of volcanoes in Russia

References 
 
  "Карпинского Вулкан" Great Soviet Encyclopedia;

Paramushir
Volcanic cones
Active volcanoes
Volcanic groups
Volcanoes of the Kuril Islands

no:Karpinskijgruppen